Piotr Tadeusz Gliński (born 20 April 1954) is a Polish sociologist, professor, university lecturer and politician. He served as president of the Polish Sociological Association from 2005 to 2011. He was the nominee of Law and Justice for Prime Minister of Poland in 2012 and again in 2014. In the cabinet of Beata Szydło, he served as the First Deputy Prime Minister and the Minister of Culture and National Heritage. He continues to serve in his Ministry in the government of Mateusz Morawiecki.

Early life and education
Piotr Tadeusz Gliński was born in Warsaw on 20 April 1954. In 1973, he graduated from the Bolesław Prus High School in Warsaw. He studied at the Institute of Economic Sciences and the Institute of Sociology of the University of Warsaw, earning a master's degree in economics in 1978. He then completed doctoral studies in the Institute of Philosophy and Sociology of the Polish Academy of Sciences. In 1984, on the basis of Labor Economic Conditions Lifestyle: Urban Families in Poland in the Seventies, written under the direction of Andrzej Siciński, he received a Ph.D. degree in humanities. He received his habilitation at the Institute of Philosophy and Sociology in 1997 with a thesis entitled The Polish Greens: The Social Movement in Transition.

Academic career

Professionally associated since the late 1970s with the Institute of Philosophy and Sociology of the Polish Academy of Sciences, he has held various positions. From 1997 to 2005, Head of the Civil Society. He was a professor at the Institute of Sociology at the University of Bialystok and head of the Department of Sociology at the University. He was awarded internships outside Poland, lecturing in European universities. His academic specialty was the study of social movements, sociology of culture and civil society, as well as in the social aspects of environmental protection. He participated in the work of the Committee for Research and Forecasting Poland in 2000 and the Committee of Man and the Environment. He has been a consultant for national and international institutions, including the Polish ministries and the United Nations Development Programme.

In 1986, he co-organized the Section of Social Forecasting of the Polish Sociological Association. From 1995 to 1997 he was treasurer of the PSA, Vice-President of the organization, and from 2005 to 2011 he served as its President. In 1989 he became a member of the Social Ecological Institute, which he headed from 1997 to 2003. He was a founding member of the Society for the creation of the Mazury National Park. He is also a member of the Collegium Invisibile. In 2003, he participated in the creation of the party Greens 2004, but due to its adoption of a leftist agenda, ultimately did not join. In 2008 Gliński received the title of professor of humanities.

Public life
On 1 October 2012, Law and Justice announced Gliński as candidate for Prime Minister with a request for a constructive vote of no confidence against the government of Donald Tusk. On 16 June 2014, Law and Justice filed a repeat request, again naming Gliński as a candidate for the office.

Four days after the 2015 Polish parliamentary election on 16 November he was nominated Deputy Prime Minister and Minister of Culture and National Heritage in the Cabinet of Beata Szydło. He was appointed by President Andrzej Duda as the Chairman of the Public Benefit Committee in 2017.

He retained his Ministry after the October 2019 Polish parliamentary election, by which Mateusz Morawiecki was elected Prime Minister.

Polish-Jewish Relations
In his keynote address on 29 November 2017 at the Third Polish-Israeli Foreign Policy Conference, convened in Warsaw by the Polish Institute for International Affairs and the Israel Council on Foreign Relations, Glinski declared:

Awards
In 2011, President Bronisław Komorowski awarded him the Officer's Cross of the Order of Polonia Restituta.

Family
Piotr Gliński is the younger brother of film director Robert Gliński.

Select publications
 Civil society in the making (red.), IFiS PAN, Warszawa 2006
 Człowiek-środowisko-zdrowie. Problemy polskie z prognostycznego punktu widzenia (red.), KPPRK PAN, Warszawa 1985
 Katastrofa smoleńska, Reakcje społeczne, polityczne i medialne (red.), IFiS PAN, Warszawa 2011
 Kulturowe aspekty struktury społecznej. Fundamenty, konstrukcje, fasady (red.), IFiS PAN, Warszawa 2010
 Polscy Zieloni. Ruch społeczny w okresie przemian, IFiS PAN, Warszawa 1996
 Samoorganizacja społeczeństwa polskiego. III sektor i wspólnoty lokalne w jednoczącej się Europie (red.), IFiS PAN, Warszawa 2002
 Socjologia i Siciński. Style życia, społeczeństwo obywatelskie, studia nad przyszłością (red.), IFiS PAN, Warszawa 2009
 Społeczne aspekty ochrony i kształtowania środowiska w Polsce, Wyd. SGGW-AR, Warszawa 1990
 Style działań organizacji pozarządowych w Polsce. Grupy interesu czy pożytku publicznego?, IFiS PAN, Warszawa 2006
 Teorie wspólnotowe a praktyka społeczna. Obywatelskość, polityka, lokalność (red.), IFiS PAN, Warszawa 2005

See also

History of Poland (1989–present)
List of political parties in Poland
List of politicians in Poland
Politics of Poland
2015 Polish presidential election

References

External links 
 
 Curriculum vitae on the website of the Polish Academy of Sciences

1954 births
Living people
Polish sociologists
Polish ecologists
Government ministers of Poland
Recipients of the Order of Polonia Restituta
Fellows of Collegium Invisibile
University of Warsaw alumni
Academic staff of the University of Białystok
Academic staff of the Polish Academy of Sciences
Culture ministers of Poland
Deputy Prime Ministers of Poland
Politicians from Warsaw
Members of the Polish Sejm 2015–2019
Members of the Polish Sejm 2019–2023